Big Lake is an intermittent dry lake located one-mile (1.6 km) south and southwest of the city of Big Lake in Reagan County, Texas.

Scrub brush, mesquite, juniper, grasses, and water-tolerant hardwoods grow around the lake.

External links

Lakes of Texas
Bodies of water of Reagan County, Texas